Harttia duriventris is a species of armored catfish endemic to Brazil where it is found above the Tucurui Dam in the Tocantins River.  This species grows to a length of  SL.

References 
 

duriventris
Catfish of South America
Fish of Brazil
Endemic fauna of Brazil
Taxa named by Lúcia Helena Rapp Py-Daniel
Taxa named by Edinbergh Caldas de Oliveira
Fish described in 2001